is a Japanese women's professional shogi player ranked 1-dan.

Early life
Katō was born on February 15, 2003, in Sendai, Miyagi Prefecture. She learned how to play shogi from her older brother when she was a second-grade elementary school student. She started playing shogi at a local shogi club in Sendai and continued to improve saying she "enjoyed playing against older people because her age didn't matter" and that it was "fun trying to figure out how each game would develop". She first thought about actually trying to become a women's professional shogi player after meeting shogi professional Akira Shima and women's shogi professional Kanna Suzuki at an shogi event for local children as part of the JSA's efforts to help those in Tōhoku region recover from the 2011 Tōhoku earthquake and tsunami.   

In April 2016, she was accepted into Class D1 of the Japan Shogi Association (JSA) training group system, and she finished tied for third in the 48th  later that same year in October. 

Katō was promoted to Class C1 of the training group system in September 2017 after winning six games in a row, which meant she met the criteria for becoming a provisional women's professional shogi player ranked 3-kyū, and officially became a provisional women's professional, under the guidance of shogi professional , on April 1, 2018. In July 2018, she advanced to the main tournament draw of the 12th , which meant that she qualified for promotion to the rank of women's professional 2-kyū and full women's professional status.

Women's shogi professional
Katō advanced to the finals of the 27th  challenger tournament in September 2019, but lost to Sae Ito.

Promotion history
Katō's promotion history is as follows:
 3-kyū: April 1, 2018
 2-kyū: July 7, 2018
 1-kyū: June 13, 2019
 1-dan: August 25, 2019

Note: All ranks are women's professional ranks.

Personal life
Katō is suffers from a congenital muscular disease and finds it difficult to sit in the seiza position required for some official games. As a result, the JSA announced in September 2019 that she can play all of her games seated in a chair at a table.

References

External links
 ShogiHub: Katō, Yuria

Japanese shogi players
Living people
Women's professional shogi players
Professional shogi players from Miyagi Prefecture
People from Sendai
2003 births